Felix Dexter (26 July 1961 – 18 October 2013) was a Saint Kitts-born British actor, comedian and writer.

Early life
Dexter was born in Saint Kitts, in the Caribbean, then a colony of the United Kingdom. He moved to Surrey with his family at the age of seven. He studied law at University College London and began training as a barrister, before embarking on a career in comedy. He began by touring late-night comedy venues, including Jongleurs club in London and The Comedy Store, before being hired to work with a Black and Asian cast in the BBC TV sketch show The Real McCoy, which was initially based on a stage show Dexter performed at the Hackney Empire Theatre.

Television
After The Real McCoy, a pilot sketch show Felix Dexter On TV was broadcast in September 1995 as part of the Comic Asides series. He wrote and starred in the sitcom pilot Douglas broadcast in 1996. Neither pilot was picked up for series, despite positive reception.

He appeared on Have I Got News for You in 1996 and later became one of the regular performers on the later series of The Fast Show. He also appeared in Citizen Khan, which first aired in 2012, as Omar, a Somali Muslim who works at a mosque in Sparkhill, Birmingham. The second series of the show aired in October 2013. He also starred in Absolutely Fabulous as John, the father of Saffron's baby.

Dexter had also voiced Francis in Crapston Villas, an adult animated sitcom soap opera, which was produced in the 1990s.

Radio
On BBC Radio 4 he featured in the satirical spoof radio phone-in show Down the Line, The Simon Day Show, and starred in the dramatisation of Delete This at Your Peril part of The Bob Servant Emails, written by Neil Forsyth.

Death
Dexter died on 18 October 2013. He had been suffering from multiple myeloma.

On 17 November 2013, BBC Two television broadcast a 30-minute retrospective programme called Respect: A Felix Dexter Special, featuring tributes from friends and colleagues. His fellow cast members from BBC Radio 4's Down the Line broadcast a special edition titled A Tribute to Felix Dexter on 23 December 2013.

Legacy
In 2014 Dexter was posthumously given Screen Nation's Edric Connor Inspiration Award.

References

External links

Felix Dexter profile at chortle.co.uk
 "Remembering Felix: friends pay tribute – London", Judith Jacob and Angie Le Mar interviewed on Dotun on Sunday, BBC London, 23 October 2013
 https://www.felixdexterfoundation.org/

1961 births
2013 deaths
Black British male actors
Black British male comedians
English comedy writers
English male stage actors
English stand-up comedians
English male television actors
Male actors from London
Alumni of University College London
Saint Kitts and Nevis emigrants to the United Kingdom
Deaths from multiple myeloma
Deaths from cancer in India
People from Surrey